Dorstenia milaneziana is a plant species in the family Moraceae which is native to eastern Brazil.

References

milaneziana
Endemic flora of Brazil
Flora of the Atlantic Forest
Flora of Espírito Santo
Flora of Rio de Janeiro (state)
Plants described in 1975